Bassi is a sub-division of Jaipur district in the state of Rajasthan. It is approximately 30 km from Jaipur city which is now considered a part of the main city. The sub-district had a population of 229,639 (2001 census) spread over 210 villages.

Bassi is a town and situated on NH 21. About 27 km from Dausa. Bassi is also a legislative assembly of Rajasthan and current MLA of Bassi is Laxman Meena. The population of bassi town is approximately 45000. Bassi is a "Nagarpalika" declared by Govt. of Rajasthan in 2020.

List of villages

Attractive palace in Bassi

References 

Jaipur district